Carlo Vitale (20 November 1902 – 8 March 1996) was an Italian painter. His work was part of the painting event in the art competition at the 1936 Summer Olympics.

References

1902 births
1996 deaths
20th-century Italian painters
20th-century Italian male artists
Italian male painters
Olympic competitors in art competitions
Painters from Milan